Nymphicula concaviuscula is a moth in the family Crambidae. It was described by Ping You, Hou-Hun Li and Shu-Xia Wang in 2003. It is found in Guizhou, China.

References

Nymphicula
Moths described in 2003